The sixth IFMAR - 1:10 Electric Off-Road World Championship was held in Japan at the Yatabe Arena in Tsukuba City.

2WD Top-10 Equipment

2WD Top-10 Equipment

4WD Top-10

4WD Top-10 Equipment

References

Works cited 

International Federation of Model Auto Racing
IFMAR 1:10 Electric Off-Road World Championship
International sports competitions hosted by Japan